Central Studios was an Indian film studio in the neighbourhood of Singanallur, Coimbatore in Tamil Nadu, started by B.Rangaswamy Naidu (a.k.a. B. R. Naidu) and other prominent industrialists like Swamikannu Vincent of Coimbatore in 1935 to make Tamil and other South Indian language movies. The studio was a major hub of Tamil movie production and notable for its association with many early day Tamil Movie Superstars, directors and script writers etc. and many making their career debuts here. The studio is best remembered for movies like Sivakavi, Velaikari and Haridas.

History

Movie industry in Coimbatore

Movies became a major industry in Coimbatore when in 1905 a South Indian Railways employee Samikannu Vincent purchased a film projector along with some silent films from a Frenchman named Du Pont who had fallen ill on his touring exhibition. Samikannu Vincent then built a business as film exhibitor first by traveling around the country and finally erecting tents theatres for screening films. His tent cinema became popular as he traveled all over the state with his mobile unit. In 1917, Samikannu Vincent built South India's first permanent cinema theatre, Variety Hall Cinema, at TownHall; it is now called ad Delite theatre. As Samikannu Vincent also generated his own electric power for his theatres, he built a series of theatres in and around the city to screen silent films. He also became a distributor for the French Pathé Frères movie projectors. In the early 1930s he launched the Variety Hall Talkies banner to make sound film (a.k.a. talkies) and released a few movies which were mainly shot in Calcutta. Feeling a need to have a movie studio, he was instrumental, along with other industrialists and movie makers, in establishing a fully equipped studio in Coimbatore.

Also during the late 1920s, another firm under Sabapathy was involved in the distributorship of an Italian movie projector company, eventually leading to the manufacture of their own brand of movie projectors in Coimbatore.  By the early thirties Coimbatore already had a studio named Premier Cinetone Studio  (later renamed Pakshiraja Studios). In 1935 a London-educated graduate, T. R. Sundaram, built a fully equipped movie studio, Modern Theatres, in Salem, and the region became the central hub for movie activity.

Studio beginnings

Central Studio was founded by a group of prominent industrialists B. Rangaswamy Naidu, R. K. Ramakrishnan Chettiar (brother of India's first Finance Minister R. K. Shanmukham Chetty), Samikannu Vincent, and another new movie director S. M. Sriramulu Naidu (who joined as a working partner). Studio commenced its operation in 1936 with their first release being Thukkaram in 1937 directed by S. M. Sriramulu Naidu. By the early 1940s the Studio became the central hub of Tamil Movie industry.

Facilities

The Studio is located at Singanallur, near to the Trichy Road in Coimbatore city. The Studio had almost all modern facilities required for a Movie studio along with Sound and film editing labs and technical workshops. The sound engineers and cameramen were all Germans during the 30s and most of the Make-Up team were from Mumbai. The studio also had a music department headed by S. M. Subbaiah Naidu. The studio also boasted the BNC Mitchell Camera, then a Hollywood standard, which cost a whopping Rs 500,000 in the 1930s and the Studio was equipped with 10 KW, 5 KW AND 2 KW lights. Most of the artists and technicians were on monthly payroll.

Studio system
The Silver Jubilee hit movie of 1936 Sivakavi starring M. K. Thyagaraja Bhagavathar, was an in-house production, as well as several socially significant movies. Central Studio released few movies, but the Studio housed lot of other production banners. The most popular being Jupiter Pictures and Pakshiraja Films. Other production houses that operated inside the studio were Narayanan and Company, Manorama Pictures and Venu Pictures. The then popular comedian trio N. S. Krishnan and T. Mathuram had their independent production unit, Ashoka Films inside the premises. They often made their comedy track independently and sold to other Movie producers who later released as ‘side reel’.

Notable film personalities

The studio was a central hub during the early days for Tamil movies first 'Superstars' P. U. Chinnappa and M. K. Thyagaraja Bhagavathar and the popular comedian N. S. Krishnan and T. A. Mathuram. The studio was also a starting point for four of Tamil Nadu state Chief Ministers C. N. Annadurai, M. Karunanidhi, M. G. Ramachandran and V. N. Janaki. The Studio housed famous musicians S. M. Subbaiah Naidu, while G. Ramanathan along with Papanasam Sivan and K. V. Mahadevan composed for some of the Studio Movies. The popular music composer M. S. Viswanathan was an assistant to S. M. Subbiah Naidu. Playback singer T. M. Soundararajan made his early foray as playback singer here so was Lyricist Kannadasan in his initial career. Central Studio was a launch pad for many later day directors like Muktha Srinivasan who was an associate director for 1954 release Sorgavasal. and K. Shankar who was in the editing department. Actress Sachu as childhood artist appeared in few films shot here. T. R. Rajakumari featured in many films shot in Central Studioc.

Famous directors who operated out of the Studio were S. M. Sriramulu Naidu, Ellis R. Dungan, A. S. A. Sami, A. P. Nagarajan and popular duo Krishnan–Panju of Parasakthi fame who directed their first movie in Central Studios. India's pioneering Cinematographer Adi Merwan Irani worked in this studio for Sivakavi and Haridas.  Sando Chinnappa Thevar, of Devar Films living nearby in Ramanathapuram was a body builder who worked as stunt actor before becoming one of Indias successful movie producers.

Final years
In 1945 S. M. Sriramulu Naidu left Central Studios to start his own Studio called Pakshiraja Studios and B. Rangaswamy Naidu family bought out majority of its shares. During the late 1940s the management leased the Studio to Jupiter Pictures.  After B. R. Naidu's demise the Studio management passed on to Lakshmi Mills family who closed it in 1959 as Chennai by then emerged as the major Movie hub and also as a result of other lobbying groups who wanted to keep movie industry out of Coimbatore, as it was then emerging into an Industrial and Educational hub. The Studio with its equipments were leased to other producers in 1958 and continued Film distribution till 1962.

Present day
Most of the Studio structure is still intact as the B. R. Naidu family uses the premises for various industrial activities. Some of the buildings houses Textile production units and small workshops. During the 70s and 80s race car constructor and driver S. Karivardhan used the studio premises to build and test his race cars.

Till 2009 the text impression ‘ Central Studios’ can found at their main entrance gate. Recently in 2010 some structures were pulled down to make way for new developments. Post 2013 the studio premises was split between the family members of B. R. Naidu and though the buildings remain as it, the approach roads are different and still remain private.

List of major releases

Movies listed here are partial list only. The list includes other Production houses operating from Central Studios.

 The 1947 Sinhala film Asokamala was also shot in Central Studios 
 The 1954 Prem Nazir hit movie Manasakshi was produced here.

See also
 Pakshiraja Studios
 Pakshiraja Films
 Jupiter Pictures
 Chamundeshwari Studios

References

Sources
 
 Coimbatore Wealth creators - The Hindu 
 Baker-turned filmmaker - The Hindu 
 Samikannu Vincent ,he brought cinema to South - The Hindu 
 [Book: Life of a Textile Pioneer Published by Limex Journal]
 [Book: B.Rangaswamy Naidu - Vazhkai Varalaru]

External links
 Remembering Kovai - Business Line
 Naidu - hits and misses - Randoor Guy
 Valmiki (1946), Movie review - The Hindu
 Rani (1952), Movie review - Randoor Guy

Indian companies established in 1935
Film production companies of Tamil Nadu
Indian film studios
Companies based in Coimbatore
Film production companies based in Coimbatore
Mass media companies established in 1935